"Ghanama" is a single by South African singer and songwriter Makhadzi, featuring  Prince Benza, released on 7 July 2021, through Open Mic Productions.

The song was certified double platinum  in South Africa.

Critical reception 
The song was certified platinum in South Africa and surpassed over million streams on Spotify.

Accolades 

!
|-
|2022
|"Ghanama"
|Favourite Song
|
|

Controversy 
Initially the song was set to be released by Makhadzi featuring King Monada, and Prince Benza. After the song  was recorded, was teased on online  platform and it received position feedback.

In 7 July, Makhadzi decided to release a song with Prince Benza.

Sdala B and Paige version

Track listing
Digital download and streaming
 "Ghanama (Zulu version)"  – 4:13

Certifications

Release
"Ghanama" was released on 7 July 2021.

References

2021 songs
2021 singles
South African songs
Google Search- Ghanama